Maria Olszewska-Lelonkiewicz (2 November 1939 in Łódź – 6 March 2007 in Łódź) was a Polish figure skating coach.

She used to work with ice dance couples, like Sylwia Nowak & Sebastian Kolasiński, Agnieszka Domańska & Marcin Głowacki and Aleksandra Kauc & Michał Zych. As a young girl she was doing rhythmic gymnastics and even placed 2nd in Polish Junior National Championships. She also played successfully handball. She was rewarded with many awards for her sacrifices for the Polish sport.

External links
Note on Lelonkiewicz, #1 
Note on Lelonkiewicz, #2 

1939 births
2007 deaths
Polish figure skating coaches
Polish rhythmic gymnasts
Sportspeople from Łódź
Female sports coaches